Perceptive Pixel is a division of Microsoft specializing in research, development and production of multi-touch interfaces. Its technology is used in fields including broadcast, defense, geo-intelligence, energy exploration, industrial design and medical imaging.

The division originated as an independent company with the name Perceptive Pixel, Inc., headquartered in New York City and maintaining offices in Mountain View, Portland, and Washington, D.C. Prior to the company's establishment, founder Jeff Han publicly demonstrated multitouch hardware and software technology at a TED conference in February 2006. Subsequently, the company shipped their first Multi-Touch Workstation and larger Multi-Touch Collaboration Wall  in 2007. The latter gained widespread recognition for transforming the way CNN covered the 2008 US Presidential elections.  In 2009, the Smithsonian awarded Perceptive Pixel the National Design Award in the inaugural category of Interaction Design.

On July 9, 2012, Microsoft CEO Steve Ballmer announced that they would acquire Perceptive Pixel Inc. in a transaction that closed three weeks later on July 31. At that year's WPC conference, Ballmer stated the company hoped to use its newly acquired technology to enhance its Windows 8 operating system.

On January 21, 2015, Microsoft announced the Surface Hub, a next-generation device under the Surface brand, developed by members of the Perceptive Pixel team.

References

External links 
Perceptive Pixel

Companies established in 2006
Companies based in New York City
Electronics companies of the United States
Computer companies of the United States
Computer hardware companies
Display technology companies
Microsoft acquisitions